The Best of 2008–2012 is the first compilation album by Chinese singer G.E.M., released on March 27, 2013, by Hummingbird Music.

Track listing

References

2013 compilation albums
G.E.M. albums